The Washington Heritage Trail is a  National Scenic Byway through the easternmost counties of West Virginia's Eastern Panhandle. The trail forms a loop through the three counties and traces the footsteps of George Washington and the marks his family left in the Eastern Panhandle. In addition to homes and sites related to the Washingtons, the Washington Heritage Trail also includes various museums, historic districts, parks, and other sites of historic significance in the area.

Route description
The Washington Heritage Trail runs through Berkeley, Jefferson, and Morgan counties in the Eastern Panhandle of West Virginia. The western end is near Paw Paw where the trail follows West Virginia Route 9 (WV 9) east to Berkeley Springs. There, the trail splits into two branches. The southern branch follows U.S. Route 522 (US 522) and WV 51, and US 340 while the northern branch continues along WV 9, WV 480 and WV 230. The two branches rejoin west of Harpers Ferry and continue to the eastern end of the byway in that city.

History
The trail was named a National Scenic Byway on June 15, 2000. It is a West Virginia State Scenic Byway as well.

References

External links
Official Washington Heritage Trail website

National Scenic Byways
Historic trails and roads in West Virginia
Transportation in Berkeley County, West Virginia
Transportation in Jefferson County, West Virginia
Transportation in Morgan County, West Virginia
Tourist attractions in Berkeley County, West Virginia
Tourist attractions in Jefferson County, West Virginia
Tourist attractions in Morgan County, West Virginia
Heritage trails